Morals, Reason, and Animals is a 1987 book by American philosopher Steve F. Sapontzis, that examines whether humans should give moral consideration to nonhuman animals and the practical implications of this.

Content 
Sapontzis argues that nonhuman animals have interests, and that it is the existence of these interests that justifies their inclusion in the moral community.  He writes that human beings should extend to animals the same moral protection for the latter's interests that we enjoy for our own. Sapontzis argues further that the burden of proof should shift toward those who argue against equal consideration for animals:Aristotle thought that men were naturally superior to women and Greeks naturally superior to other races; Victorians thought white men had to shoulder the burden of being superior to savages; and Nazis thought Aryans were a master race. We have come to reject these and many other supposedly natural hierarchies; the history of what we consider moral progress can be viewed as, in large part, the replacement of hierarchical worldviews with a presumption in favor of forms of egalitarianism. This substitution places the burden of proof on those who would deny equal consideration to the interests of all concerned, rather than on those who seek such consideration. Consequently, some reason is needed to justify the fairness of maintaining a hierarchical worldview when we are dealing with animals.The claim that rationality should be prerequisite for moral consideration is challenged by Sapontzis, who argues that the experience of pain is not greater if an individual is more intelligent and that the opposite may well be the case, as individuals who lack the capacity to understand why they are experiencing pain in a certain situation may suffer more as a result.

Sapontzis also investigates the issue of wild animal suffering and whether humans have an obligation to help these animals. He questions the view that aiding these individuals is ridiculous or absurd, instead arguing that if we have the means to help an individual suffering in such a situation, we should do so; as long as we do not inflict a greater harm in the process. Sapontzis makes a clear distinction between his antispeciesist position and that of environmentalists who are against helping animals suffering in these situations. These ideas were anteceded by his 1984 paper, "Predation".

References

Further reading 
 
 
 
 

1987 non-fiction books
Animal ethics books

Books about animal rights
Books about animal testing
Books about vegetarianism
Books about wild animal suffering
Environmental ethics books
Temple University Press books